Gary Powell (born 10 September 1963) is a British actor. He is possibly best known for playing the character Laurie Bates in the BBC soap opera EastEnders.

Career
Laurie made his first screen appearance in September 1989 as a love interest for Kathy Beale (Gillian Taylforth), but the character was one of many to be written out of the serial early in 1990, following the introduction of executive producer, Michael Ferguson.

Powell's other television work has included roles in: Between The Lines (1992); Inspector Morse (1987; 1995); Thief Takers (1996); Kavanagh QC (1997); Beech is Back (2001); A Touch Of Frost (2003); Judge John Deed (2005); Holby City (2005); The Golden Hour (2005); Tom Brown's Schooldays (2005); Five Days (2006) and Doctor Who episode "42", playing Dev Ashton (2007). He made several other appearances in The Bill in 2005, 2006 and made a larger appearance as Darren Cuttler in The Bills series Gun Runner.

Film credits have included: Crush (2001); From Hell (2001), Hollywoodland (2006) and Silent Hours (2015).

Filmography

Film

Television

External links
 

1963 births
British male soap opera actors
Living people